Karlovsko Praskalo is a waterfall in the Central Balkan National Park, Balkan Mountains, central Bulgaria. It is located at 1,450 m altitude in the southern slope of the Zhaltets Peak. The waterfall is 30 m high. Karlovsko Praskalo and the surrounding area was declared a natural landmark in 1965.

Waterfalls of Bulgaria
Balkan mountains
Landforms of Plovdiv Province